21st Circuitry Shox 2 is a various artists compilation album released on September 29, 1998 by 21st Circuitry.

Reception

21st Circuitry Shox 2 received criticism from Aiding & Abetting for providing an insufficient introduction to the bands that make up the album. Keith Farley of AllMusic said the compilation "includes tracks from Unit 187, Hate Dept., Ga-T, Xorcist and others."

Track listing

Personnel

Adapted from the 21st Circuitry Shox 2 liner notes.

Release history

References

External links 
 21st Circuitry Shox 2 at Discogs (list of releases)

1998 compilation albums
Electronic body music compilation albums
21st Circuitry compilation albums